Mob Rule (also known as Constructor: Street Wars and Street Wars: Constructor Underworld in Europe) is a real-time strategy video game for Microsoft Windows released in 1999 by Simon & Schuster and 3Studio. It is the successor to the 1997 video game Constructor. The goal of the game is to construct buildings and fight enemy teams in a Mafia-themed background. It was re-released on GOG.com in 2010 for Windows and in 2013 for MacOS.

Critical reception 

The game received mixed reviews according to the review aggregation website GameRankings.

References

External links 
 
 

1999 video games
MacOS games
Multiplayer and single-player video games
Organized crime video games
Real-time strategy video games
Simon & Schuster Interactive games
Windows games
Video games developed in the United Kingdom